The Taiwan Historica (TH) is an institution located in Zhongxing New Village, Nantou City, Nantou County, Taiwan established to compile the common history of Taiwan Province.

History
Taiwan Historica was originally established on 1 June 1948 as Taiwan Provincial Common History Historica. It was then changed to Historical Research Committee of Taiwan Province in July 1949. The committee was affiliated to the Civil Affairs Department in 1958, to the Cultural Affairs Department in July 1997, to Taiwan Provincial Government in July 1999 and to Academia Historica on 1 January 2002 and changed its name to Taiwan Historica on the same date.

Facilities

 Folklore Artifacts Hall
 Records and Archives Hall
 Historical Documents Exhibition Hall

See also
 Taiwan Province

References

External links
 

1948 establishments in Taiwan
Buildings and structures in Nantou County
Research institutes in Taiwan
Scientific organizations established in 1948